is a Japanese actress. She was given a Best New Talent award at the 1998 Yokohama Film Festival.

External links

1979 births
Living people
Actresses from Kanagawa Prefecture
21st-century Japanese actresses